Ryabki is a rural locality (a selo) and the administrative center of Ryabkovskoye Rural Settlement, Chernushinsky District, Perm Krai, Russia. The population was 1,302 as of 2010. There are 21 streets.

Geography 
Ryabki is located 13 km northeast of Chernushka (the district's administrative centre) by road. Bikulka is the nearest rural locality.

References 

Rural localities in Chernushinsky District